Latamber is a town and Union council of Karak District in Khyber-Pakhtunkhwa province of Pakistan. It is an important town in the district of Karak and is located 29 kilometres to the east of Bannu at 33°6'33N 70°52'3E.

Latamber also known as Latammar in Khattakwola dialect is inhabited by the Barak sub-tribe of Khattaks they belong to the Ozhd(Mashi khel section) the clan being Barki Khel also known as Haider Khan Khel or simply Haider Khel further they are divided into Aziz khel,Kami Khel, khawazin Khel and Rehmat khel.Kami khel live in Surdag and Latammar and other villages in this union council, the Rehmat khels live in Garuzi(groozi) also known as Rehmatabad. Latammar is adjoined by the Land Kammar tract where the "Land”section of the Barak subtribe live

References

Populated places in Karak District
Karak District